Shavon-e Olya (also Romanized as Shāvon-e ‘Olyā; also known as Shadoon Olya and Shāvon-e Bālā) is a village in Ani Rural District, in the Central District of Germi County, Ardabil Province, Iran. At the 2006 census, its population was 126, in 24 families.

References 

Towns and villages in Germi County